The Mount Pleasant railway line is an abandoned South Australian line. It was opened between Balhannah and Mount Pleasant in September 1918 and ran until March 1963 as a freight and passenger service. Part of its trackbed is now the Amy Gillett Bikeway rail trail near to Adelaide.

History
The line opened on 16 September 1918 between Balhannah, 10 kilometres east of Mount Lofty, and Mount Pleasant. The line had six stations and a number of halts, typically the halts were located near level crossings. The six stations were Oakbank, Woodside, Charleston, Mount Torrens, Birdwood, and Mount Pleasant. The seven halts were Mappinga, Riverview, Kayannie, Muralappie, Milkappa Road, Crane Road, and Narcoonah.

The line was closed on 4 March 1963, and the way between Balhannah and Oakbank has mostly returned to private landowners.

Rail trail
This former railway is in the jurisdiction of the Adelaide Hills Council, which in 2003 commissioned a feasibility study into the best use of the land. The report recommended it be converted to a rail trail, which the council agreed with but considered it beyond their means to do so. However, since that time, the development of a rail trail lead to the opening of the Amy Gillett Rail Trail in 2010, named in honour of the late Amy Gillett, a South Australian born Olympic Cyclist who had died in 2005. As of 2015, the conversion had reached from Balhannah to Mount Torrens.

Line guide

References 

Closed railway lines in South Australia
Railway lines opened in 1918
Railway lines closed in 1953